Green Currin (October 20, 1842 or 1844 – October 21, 1918) was the first African American to serve in the Oklahoma Territorial Legislature that existed before statehood in 1907. He was the author of the Oklahoma Territory's first civil rights legislation, a proposal to penalize racial violence, that failed by one vote.

Currin participated in the Land Run of 1889 and served as the grand master of an African American Masonic Order in Oklahoma.

Early life
There is conflicting information about Currin's birth, which is listed as October 20, 1842, in Tennessee, in a published obituary and as 1844 in a 1900 U.S. Census for Oklahoma Territory.

After living in Nashville, Tennessee and Kansas, Currin participated in the Land Run of 1889 in Kingfisher County, Oklahoma Territory.

Political career
A Republican, Currin, was one of five delegates elected to the Oklahoma Territorial House of Representatives from Kingfisher County, taking his seat August 27, 1890.

Due to an incident in Kingfisher in which three white men clubbed and injured an African American man, Currin authored House Bill 119, which penalized racial violence. After receiving approval in the Territorial House of Representatives, it failed by one vote in the Territorial Senate.

Currin did not run for re-election after his first term.

Masonic Order of Oklahoma
Currin, like many African Americans of his time was involved in African American fraternal orders, serving as the grand master of the St. John Grand Lodge of the AF & AM Masonic Order of Oklahoma. Not long before his death, a Masonic temple was built in Boley, Oklahoma.

Later life, death and legacy
Currin served as a deputy U.S. marshal and on the board of regents for the Colored Agricultural and Normal College known today as Langston University.

Currin was alive for Oklahoma statehood in 1907 and the election of A. C. Hamlin to the Oklahoma Legislature. He was also alive for the constitutional amendment intended to block potential black voters from registering and the 1915 case, Guinn v. United States, that struck it down.

The "grandfather clause" was responsible for an exodus of African Americans from Oklahoma to Canada.

Currin died at his home in Dover, Oklahoma on October 21, 1918, and was buried in Burns cemetery.

See also
Oklahoma Territory
Oklahoma Legislature
A. C. Hamlin

References

1918 deaths
Year of birth uncertain
Oklahoma Republicans
People from Kingfisher County, Oklahoma
1840s births
Members of the Oklahoma Territorial Legislature
19th-century American politicians
African-American state legislators in Oklahoma
20th-century African-American people